The Springfield Model 1847 was a percussion lock musketoon produced by the Springfield Armory in the mid-19th century.

History
Muskets were designed for a dual purpose on the battlefield. They could be used as a ranged weapon, and they could also be used as a pike for short range fighting. Because they were used in a manner similar to a pike, muskets had to be long and heavy, which made them impractical for other uses. Because of this, many muskets were produced in a shorter version, often called a carbine or a musketoon. These shorter weapons were often used by naval forces and cavalry.

The Model 1847 carbine was a shortened version of the Springfield Model 1842 standard infantry musket.

Three basic models were produced at Springfield between 1847 and 1859. The total production of all three models is estimated at approximately 10,000 carbines.

The cavalry model was not highly regarded by those mounted troops to whom they were issued. Inspector General Joseph K. Mansfield conducted a tour of the Western outposts in 1853 and reported that the troops made many derogatory comments about their carbines. Dragoons told him that when the weapon was carried by a mounted trooper, the ball would simply roll out of the weapon's barrel. His report also stated that "There is no probable certainty of hitting the object aimed at, and the recoil is too great to be fired with ease." Mansfield concluded that the gun was essentially "a worthless arm," having "no advocates that I am aware of."

The Model 1847 musketoon's inadequacies were largely responsible for Steptoe's loss at the Battle of Pine Creek (along with other poor equipment selections).

Design and Features
The Model 1847, like the Model 1842 musket that it was based on, had a .69 caliber barrel, and was fired using a percussion lock system. The barrel was much shorter, only 26 inches in length compared to the Model 1842's 42 inch barrel. The Model 1842 had been produced as a smoothbore musket, but many were later rifled. The Model 1847 carbines were also produced as a smoothbore weapon, and a small number of these also were later rifled.

Smoothbore carbines were not sighted. The carbines that were rifled were also fitted with sights.

Like the Model 1842 musket, the Model 1847 carbine used barrel bands to attach the barrel to the stock. The carbine, being much shorter, only required two barrel bands, instead of the three required for the longer Model 1842 musket.

The Model 1847 carbine featured a small lock and chain or metal bale for attaching the ramrod which was especially useful while reloading on horseback.

The total weight of the carbine was approximately 7.4 lbs, and its overall length was 41 inches.

Variants
The Model 1847 musketoon was produced in three variants, called the Artillery, Cavalry, and Sappers (engineers) models.

See also
 Springfield musket

References

 Troiani, Don; Coates, Earl J.; Kochan, James; Don Troiani's soldiers in America, 1754-1865, Stackpole Books, 1998,

External links

Springfield firearms
Muskets
American Civil War weapons
Weapons of the Confederate States of America